Lucie Hradecká and František Čermák were the defending champions, but Čermák chose not to participate this year. Hradecká played alongside Mariusz Fyrstenberg but lost in the second round to the eventual champions Anna-Lena Grönefeld and Jean-Julien Rojer.

Anna-Lena Grönefeld and Jean-Julien Rojer defeated Julia Görges and Nenad Zimonjić 4–6, 6–2, [10–7] in the final.

Seeds

Main draw

Finals

Top half

Bottom half

External links 
 Draw
2014 French Open – Doubles draws and results at the International Tennis Federation

Mixed Doubles
French Open by year – Mixed doubles